Jay Chhaniyara (born 22 October 1993) is an Indian stand-up comedian. A performer since the age of six, he came to public attention following appearances on Star One's The Great Indian Laughter Challenge. He has also performed on Zee TV in Aashayein, and on SAB TV's Taarak Mehta Ka Ooltah Chashmah in 2011 during Gokuldham Khel Mahotsav. Chhaniyara has cerebral palsy.

Early life 
Jay Chhaniyara was born in Rajkot, Gujarat. His father is a retired government servant. His mother is a housewife. He has an elder brother.

Career 

Chhaniyara started to perform to his family as a child to deal with the pain of operations. His parents arranged for him to perform publicly during the Gujarati festival of Navratra. The audiences were enthralled and there was a standing ovation for him.

References 

1993 births
Indian male comedians
Living people
Indian people with disabilities
People from Rajkot
People with cerebral palsy